This is a list of works of children's literature that have been made into feature films. The title of the work and the year it was published are both followed by the work's author, the title of the film, and the year of the film. If a film has an alternate title based on geographical distribution, the title listed will be that of the widest distribution area.

Fiction

A

B

C

D

E

F

G

H

I

J

K

L

M

N

O

P

R

S

T

U

V

W

Y

Z

Non-fiction

See also

 List of American children's books
 List of children's book series

 
Films
Lists of films based on books
Lists of works adapted into films